State Route 306 (SR 306) is a north–south state highway in northeastern Ohio, running from its southern terminus at SR 43 in Aurora to its northern terminus at SR 283 in Mentor.  Most of the road from Aurora north to Kirtland is part of the former Chillicothe Turnpike and is known as Chillicothe Road. The Kirtland Temple, the first temple built by the Latter Day Saint movement (Mormons), is located on SR 306 in central Kirtland.

History
SR 306 was first designated in 1932 following its current route between US 322 and SR 283. In 1935, the Aurora-US 422 segment was brought into the state highway system, but as SR 382. By 1937, the two routes were united as SR 306; also at this time, the road connecting Aurora and Hudson was included as the southernmost segment of SR 306. In 1942, the Hudson-Aurora segment was removed from the state highway system, but by this time, the entire route had been paved. No major changes have occurred to the routing since that time.

Major junctions

References

External links

State Route 306 Endpoint Photos

306
Transportation in Geauga County, Ohio
Transportation in Portage County, Ohio
Transportation in Lake County, Ohio